Killavullen GAA is a Gaelic Athletic Association club based in the parish of Killavullen, Cork, Ireland. The club fields teams in competitions organized by the Cork GAA county board and the Avondhu GAA divisional board. The club fields teams in both hurling and Gaelic football.

History
Killavullen GAA club is one of the oldest official clubs in North Cork, having been founded on 15 February 1888 under the auspices of the then newly formed Gaelic Athletic Association.  With the exception of a North Cork Junior hurling championship that they annexed in 1929, the club toiled away without much success. Persistence paid off in 1962 when the club contested the final of the Avondhu Novice hurling Championship and won this competition in 1968. The club made a breakthrough in football in 1963, which was the club's first football title. They went out to further glory in 1979 when they were crowned North Cork Junior (B) Hurling League Champions.

Achievements
 Munster Junior B Club Hurling Championship Winner (1) 2018
 Cork Premier Intermediate Football Championship Runners-Up 2007
 Cork Junior Football Championship Winners (1) 2000; Runners-Up 1998
 Cork Junior B Football Championship Runners-Up 1993
 Cork Junior B Hurling Championship Winners (1) 2017   Runners-Up 2006, 2016
 Cork Minor B Hurling Championship Winners (1) 1994
 North Cork Junior A Football Championship Winners (3) 1998, 1999, 2000
 North Cork Junior A Hurling Championship Runners-Up 1929
 North Cork Junior B Hurling Championship Winners (2) 1981, 2012

References

 Killavullen GAA Club website

Gaelic games clubs in County Cork
Gaelic football clubs in County Cork
Hurling clubs in County Cork